Alvaneu (Romansh: Alvagni) is a former municipality in the district of Albula in the canton of Graubünden in Switzerland.  On 1 January 2015 the former municipalities of Alvaschein, Mon, Stierva, Tiefencastel, Alvaneu, Brienz/Brinzauls and Surava merged to form the new municipality of Albula/Alvra.

On 20 March 2007 Peter Martin Wettler, a media expert and resident of Zurich was appointed Prince of Belfort by the village's authorities.

History
Alvaneu is first mentioned in 1244 as Aluenude.  In 1530 it was mentioned as Allweneü.

Geography

 
Of this area, 27% is used for agricultural purposes, while 32.8% is forested. Of the rest of the land, 2% is settled (buildings or roads) and the remainder (38.2%) is non-productive (rivers, glaciers or mountains).

The former municipality is located in the Belfort sub-district of the Albula district.  It is located on a terrace above the Albula river.  It consists of the village of Alvaneu (Alvaneu-Dorf) and Alvaneu-Bad on the valley floor.  The municipality also includes the settlement of Aclas d'Alvagni as well as the alpine settlements of Creusch and Ramoz.

Demographics
Alvaneu had a population (as of 2013) of 403.  , 7.6% of the population was made up of foreign nationals.  Over the last 10 years the population has decreased at a rate of -6.2%.

In the 2007 federal election the most popular party was the SVP which received 42% of the vote.  The next three most popular parties were the CVP (25.1%), the SPS (22.8%) and the FDP (7.9%).

In Alvaneu about 69.7% of the population (between age 25-64) have completed either non-mandatory upper secondary education or additional higher education (either university or a Fachhochschule).

Alvaneu has an unemployment rate of 0.27%.  , there were 43 people employed in the primary economic sector and about 16 businesses involved in this sector.  37 people are employed in the secondary sector and there are 4 businesses in this sector.  124 people are employed in the tertiary sector, with 23 businesses in this sector.

The historical population is given in the following table:

Languages
The traditional language of the population until the middle of the 19th century was Romansh. However, in 1880, only  80.1% of the inhabitants spoke Romansch as their native language. This erosion continued (1910: 68.06%, 1941: 56.0%, 1970: 47.03%). 1960 was the last census that counted a Romansch-speaking majority.

Although 31% still speak some Romansch, German is now the only official language for municipality business.

Most of the population speaks German (76.4%), with Rhaeto-Romance being second most common (16.9%) and Italian being third ( 3.5%).

References

External links

Gemeinde Alvaneu—official site of the municipality 
Bad Alvaneu—thermal baths 

Albula/Alvra
Former municipalities of Graubünden